Trusts Act (with its variations) is a stock short title used in Malaysia, New Zealand, Niue, Queensland and the United Kingdom for legislation relating to trusts.

List

Australia

New South Wales
The Trustees Act 1853
The Trustee Act Amendment Act 1886
The Trustee Act 1898 (No 4)
The Trustee Act Amendment Act 1902 (No 98)
The Trustees Audit Act 1912 (No 21)
The Trustees Delegation of Powers Act 1915 (No 31)
The Trustee Act 1925 (No 14)
The Trustee (Amendment) Act 1929 (No 60)
The Trustees Protection Act 1931 (No 28)
The Trustee (Amendment) Act 1979 (No 189)
The Trustee (Investment Powers) Amendment Act 1982 (No 35)
The Trustee (Powers of Attorney) Amendment Act 1983 (No 28)
The Trustee (Investments) Amendment Act 1983 (No 204)
The Trustee (Amendment) Act 1984 (No 169)
The Trustee (Trustees' Agents) Amendment Act 1985 (No 89)
The Trustee (Amendment) Act 1987 (No 139)
The Trustee (Amendment) Act 1993 (No 18)
The Trustee Amendment Act 1996 (No 100)
The Trustee Amendment (Discretionary Investments) Act 1997 (No 102)
The Trust Property Act of 1862
The Trust Property Act Amendment Act of 1893 
The Trust Property (Amendment) Act 1897 (No 38)
The Trust Investments Act 1849
The Trust Moneys Deposit Act 1857
The Trust Funds Security Act 1858
The Trustee and Wills (Emergency Provisions) Act 1940 (No 32)
The Trustee and Directors Frauds Prevention Act 1858
The Trustee Companies Act 1952
The Trustee Companies Act 1964 (No 6)
The Trustee Companies (Amendment) Act 1969 (No 6)
The Trustee Companies (Amendment) Act 1972 (No 45)
The Trustee Companies (Amendment) Act 1979 (No 186)
The Trustee Companies (Amendment) Act 1982 (No 61)
The Trustee Companies (Further Amendment) Act 1982 (No 173)
The Trustee Companies (Amendment) Act 1983 (No 82)
The Trustee Companies (Amendment) Act 1985 (No 88)
The Trustee Companies (Amendment) Act 1986 (No 121)
The Trustee Companies (Amendment) Act 1989 (No 42)
The Trustee Companies (Further Amendment) Act 1989 (No 176)
The Trustee Companies (Amendment) Act 1990 (No 98)
The Trustee Companies Amendment Act 1997 (No 46)
The Trustee Companies Amendment (Reserve Liabilities) Act 1998 (No 37)
The Trustee Companies Amendment Act 2000 (No 39)
The Trustee Companies Amendment Act 2009 (No 109)

Queensland
The Trusts Act 1973

Tasmania
The Trustee Act 1898
The Trustee Act 1941 (5 Geo 6 No 17)
The Trustee Act 1964 (No 6)
The Trustee Act 1965 (No 7)
The Trustee (Insured Housing Loans) Act 1970 (No 17)
The Trustee Act 1970 (No 66)
The Trustee Act 1973 (No 65)
The Trustee Act 1976 (No 55)
The Trustee Amendment Act 1979 (No 49)
The Trustee Amendment Act 1981 (No 47)
The Trustee Amendment Act 1985 (No 52)
The Trustee Amendment Act (No 2) 1985 (No 18)
The Trustee Amendment Act 1992 (No 35)
The Trustee Amendment (Investment Powers) Act 1997 (No 64)
The Trustee Amendment (Miscellaneous Amendments) Act 2006 (No 9)

Western Australia
The Trustee Ordinance 1854 (17 Vict No 10)
The Trustees Act 1900 (64 Vict No 17)
The Trustees Act 1962 (No 78)
The Trustees Act Amendment Act 1927 (No 7)
The Trustees Protection Act 1931 (No 10)
The Trustees Powers Act 1931 (No 9)
The Trustees Powers Amendment Act 1935 (No 4)
The Trustees Act Amendment Act 1951 (No 38)
The Trustees Act Amendment Act 1955 (No 35)
The Trustees Act Amendment Act (No 2) 1955 (No 54)
The Trustees Act Amendment Act 1956 (No 39)
The Trustees Act Amendment Act 1957 (No 15)
The Trustees Act Amendment Act 1968 (No 18)
The Trustees Amendment Act 1987 (No 84)
The Trustees Amendment Act 1997 (No 1)
The Trustee Investment Act 1889 (53 Vict No 14)
The Trustees Colonial Investment Act 1900 (64 Vict No 12)
The Trust Funds Investment Act 1924 (No 10)
The Trust Funds Investment Act Amendment Act 1926 (No 4)
The Trustee Companies Act 1987 (No 111)
The Trustee Companies Amendment Act 1994 (No 42)
The Trustee Companies (Commenwealth Regulation) Act 2011 (No 39)

Victoria
The Trusts Act 1890
The Trusts Act 1891
The Trusts Act 1893
The Trusts Act 1896
The Trusts Act 1901
The Trusts Act 1906
The Trusts Act 1915
The Trusts Act 1915 (No 2)
The Trusts Act 1915 (No 3)
The Trusts (War Loan) Act 1915
The Trusts Act 1920
The Trusts Act 1922
The Trust Funds Act 1897
The Trust Funds Act 1902
The Trust Funds Act 1902 (No 2)
The Trust Funds Act 1906
The Trustees' Investments Act 1922
The Trustee Act 1928
The Trustee Act 1931
The Trustee (Investments) Act 1933
The Trustee Act 1936
The Trustee Act 1939
The Trustee Act 1953
The Trustee (Amendment) Act 1953
The Trustee Act 1958
The Trustee (Amendment) Act 1959
The Trustee (Mortgages) Act 1959
The Trustee (Mortgages) Act 1962
The Trustee (Variation of Trusts) Act 1962
The Trustee (Amendment) Act 1969
The Trustee (Authorized Investments) Act 1969
The Trustee (Authorized Investments) Act 1978
The Trustee (Authorized Investments) Act 1981
The Trustee (Authorized Investments) Act 1982
The Trustee (Amendment) Act 1984
The Trustee (Secondary Mortgage Market Amendment) Act 1985
The Trustee (Amendment) Act 1986
The Trustee (Amendment) Act 1989
The Trustee and Trustee Companies (Amendment) Act 1995
The Trustee Companies Act 1928
The Trustee Companies Act 1944
The Trustee Companies (Commission) Act 1953
The Trustee Companies Act 1957
The Trustee Companies Act 1958
The Trustee Companies (Amalgamation) Act 1960
The Trustee Companies (Amalgamation) Act 1962
The Trustee Companies (The Perpetual Executors and Trustees Association of Australia Limited) Act 1963
The Trustee Companies (Affidavits) Act 1964
The Trustee Companies (Burns Philp Trustee Company Limited) Act 1969
The Trustee Companies (Perpetual Trustees Australia Limited) Act 1970
The Trustee Companies (Equity Trustees) Act 1971
The Trustee Companies (National Trustees) Act 1972
The Trustee Companies (Sandhurst and Northern District Trustees Executors and Agency Company Limited) Act 1972
The Trustee Companies (Commission) Act 1975
The Trustee Companies (Union-Fidelity) Amendment Act 1976
The Trustee Companies (Amendment) Act 1978
The Trustee Companies (Amendment) Act 1979
The Trustee Companies (Trustees Executors) Act 1979
The Trustee Companies (Amendment) Act 1983
The Trustee Companies Act 1984
The Trustee Companies (Amendment) Act 1988
The Trustee Companies Legislation Amendment Act 2010 (No 17)

Malaysia
The Trusts (State Legislatures Competency) Act 1949

New Zealand
 The Trusts Act 2019 (No 38)

Niue
The Trusts Act 1994

United Kingdom
The Variation of Trusts Act 1958
The Trusts (Scotland) Act 1961
The Trust Investment Act 1889 (52 & 53 Vict c 32)
The Trustee Act 1850 (13 & 14 Vict c 60)
The Trustee Act 1852 (15 & 16 Vict c 55)
The Trustee Act 1888 (51 & 52 Vict c 59)
The Trustee Act 1893 (56 & 57 Vict c 53)
The Trustee Act 1925
The Trustee Act 2000
The Trustee Act (Northern Ireland) 1958
An Act for better securing trust funds, and for the relief of trustees (10 & 11 Vict c 96) is sometimes called the Trustee Relief Act 1847
11 & 12 Vict c 68 is sometimes called the Trustee Relief (Ireland) Act 1848
An Act for the further relief of trustees (12 & 13 Vict c 74) is sometimes called the Trustee Relief Act 1849

The Trusts (Scotland) Acts 1861 to 1891 was the collective title of the following Acts:
The Trusts (Scotland) Act 1861 (24 & 25 Vict c 84)
The Trusts (Scotland) Act 1867 (30 & 31 Vict c 97)
The Trusts (Scotland) Amendment Act 1891 (47 & 48 Vict c 63)
The Trusts (Scotland) Amendment Act 1867 Amendment Act 1887 (50 & 51 Vict c 18)
The Trusts (Scotland) Amendment Act 1891 (54 & 55 Vict c 44)

The Charitable Trusts Acts 1853 to 1894 was the collective title of the following Acts:
The Charitable Trusts Act 1853 (16 & 17 Vict c 137)
The Charitable Trusts Amendment Act 1855 (18 & 19 Vict c 124)
The Charitable Trusts Act 1860 (23 & 24 Vict c 136)
The Charitable Trusts Act 1862 (25 & 26 Vict c 112)
The Charitable Trusts Act 1869 (32 & 33 Vict c 110)
The Charitable Trusts Act 1887 (50 & 51 Vict c 49)
The Charitable Trusts (Recovery) Act 1891 (54 & 55 Vict c 17)
The Charitable Trusts (Places of Religious Worship) Amendment Act 1894 (57 & 58 Vict c 35)

The Trustee Appointment Acts 1850 to 1890 is the collective title of the following Acts:
The Trustee Appointment Act 1850 (13 & 14 Vict c 28)
The Trustee Appointment Act 1869 (32 & 33 Vict c 26)
The Trustee Appointment Act 1890 (53 & 54 Vict c 19)

The Trustee Savings Banks Acts 1863 to 1893 was the collective title of the following Acts:
The Trustee Savings Banks Act 1863 (26 & 27 Vict c 87)
So much of the Savings Banks Act 1887 (50 & 51 Vict c 40) as relates to Trustee Savings Banks
The Trustee Savings Banks Act 1887 (50 & 51 Vict c 47)
The Savings Banks Act 1891 (54 & 55 Vict c 21)
The Savings Banks Act 1893 (56 & 57 Vict c 69)

See also
List of short titles

References

Lists of legislation by short title and collective title